Rimlan-e Vosta (also Romanized as Rīmlān-e Vosţá; also known as Zahary, Jahlī Rīmdān, Rameh Dān, Remdān, Remīdān, Rīmdān, and Rīmdān-e Avval) is a village in Sand-e Mir Suiyan Rural District, Dashtiari District, Chabahar County, Sistan and Baluchestan Province, Iran. At the 2006 census, its population was 241, in 69 families.

References 

Populated places in Chabahar County